The Volkswagen ID.4 and Volkswagen ID.5 are battery electric compact crossover SUVs produced by Volkswagen. Based on the MEB platform, the ID.4 is the second model of the Volkswagen ID. series. The production version of the ID.4 debuted in September 2020 as the first fully-electric crossover SUV under the Volkswagen brand, while the coupe-shaped variant of the ID.4 (akin to the Audi e-tron Sportback) is marketed as the Volkswagen ID.5 and was revealed in November 2021.

The ID.4 is positioned by Volkswagen as a high-volume, mass-market electric vehicle — a car for "the millions, not the millionaires," as the company claimed in its advertising. It was delivered to European customers from late 2020, and the first quarter of 2021 for the North American market.

The ID.4 was elected World Car of the Year 2021 over runner-ups Honda e and Toyota Yaris.

Overview 
The ID.4 was previewed the I.D. Crozz and I.D. Crozz II concept cars, which debuted in 2017 at the Shanghai and Frankfurt Auto Show, respectively. A prototype version of the ID.4 appeared in camouflage at the 2019 Frankfurt Motor Show discreetly so as not to steal the show from the first electric mass-market vehicle of the German brand, the ID.3.

The production version was unveiled globally on 23 September 2020. Unlike the ID.3 which is oriented mainly for the European market, the ID.4 also targeted the North American region as one of its core markets. Volkswagen Group of America CEO Scott Keogh went as far as saying the ID.4 "drives like a GTI, it has the packaging of a Tiguan and the purpose of the Beetle," to emphasize its driving dynamics, design, and technology.

At launch, the electric SUV was solely offered with rear-wheel-drive and an electric motor located at the rear axle, with the dual motor all-wheel-drive version following later. First sales were for the ID.4 "1st edition", which differs in some interior and exterior features from the series production models.

Headlights and taillights are mostly LED lamps on the ID.4, with Matrix LED lights being an optional feature in some regions. The front features a low-positioned air inlet behind which the radiator and parts of the air conditioning system are located. Wheels are offered in 18–21 inch sizes. RWD models can tow a maximum of  braked with an optional tow bar and fits roof rails as standard.

Apple Carplay and Android Auto are offered as standard, in addition to an optional augmented reality head-up display (HUD). In addition to the 5.3 inch driver display, the ID.4 features a 10-inch infotainment screen, though an optional 12 inch screen is available. By default, the vehicle includes a light strip below the windscreen providing visual cues related to certain functions such as the state of charge (SOC) when charging or brake alerts, which VW calls "ID. Light".

Safety features include VW's Car2X communication system.

An optional heat pump extending range under low temperature conditions is offered or even fitted as standard in certain markets such as Canada and uses a R744 (CO2) refrigerant. It is claimed to heat the cabin 2-3 times more efficiently than a resistance heater.

The boot offers 848 L of volume and 1,817 L when the rear seats are folded, although the vehicle does not offer a storage compartment at the front end ("frunk").

Volkswagen ID.5 
The Volkswagen ID.5 was previewed in August 2021, revealed in November 2021, and produced since January 2022. It features a lower 0.26 drag coefficient, which is 0.02 lower than the ID.4. The model is available in three variants, which are Pro, Pro Performance and GTX, with the latter using a dual motor all-wheel-drive layout. Three powertrain options are available, although unlike the ID.4, the ID.5 comes with just one battery capacity, which is 77 kWh. The ID.5's sloping roofline decreases the cargo space, which offers 549 L with the rear seats up and 1,561 L with the seats folded.

Specifications

Powertrain 
The ID.4 is fitted with the APP 310 drive of the underlying MEB platform, which consists of a water-cooled brushless permanently excited synchronous machine positioned at the rear axle.

The ID.4 recuperates energy when braking using the service brake pedal, with up to 0.25 g. When driving with the gear selector set to “D” mode, if the driver lifts their foot off the accelerator pedal, the vehicle is set to coast along in order to preserve energy, with the motor freely rotating. However the vehicle can also be set to “B” mode where it will recuperate instead, again with forces of up to 0.25 g. When stronger deceleration is required, the vehicle uses electrically-boosted conventional hydraulic brakes.

Battery 
The battery consists of a lithium-Ion battery pack which houses 9 battery modules in 10 compartments (Pure) or 12 modules (Pro) containing the individual battery cells (24 per module) in a rectangular aluminium casing which sits in the vehicle's underbody. While the smaller battery holds an energy content of 55 kWh, of which 52 kWh are made available to the user, the larger pack comes in at 82/77 kWh.

Markets

Europe 
For the European market, the ID.4 is available with three electric motor options. The range-topping model is capable of a  sprint in 8.5 seconds.

The ID.4 is produced at the Volkswagen Zwickau-Mosel Plant in Germany and will also be built at the company's Emden plant from 2022.

North America 
It is powered by a 62 kWh or 82 kWh battery pack (gross capacity) positioned in the underbody. The 62 kWh battery pack has not been EPA rated as of August 2022, Volkswagen estimates it will be able to achieve  on a full charge.

2021-2022 models were imported to North America and built in the Volkswagen Zwickau-Mosel Plant.

For model year 2023, the Volkswagen ID.4 sold in North America will be made in Volkswagen's Chattanooga Tennessee Assembly Plant. The North American ID.4 got a moderate refresh for 2023 that introduced a new 62 kWh battery pack that is now on the new Standard and S trim levels, the Standard trim level reduced the base price of the ID.4 to $37,495. The larger 82 kWh battery pack got updated to increase the peak DCFC charging rate from 135 kW to 170 kW. This refresh also includes a redesigned center console, a larger 12-inch Discover Pro Max infotainment system, Park Assist Plus (autonomous parking system), and 45-watt USB-C fast device charging standard across all trims. As well as new options like Area View (surround view camera system), VW Premium Sound system, three-zone automatic climate control, heated rear seats, and new paint colors.

China 
The Volkswagen ID.4 is available as two variants in China called the ID.4 X and the ID.4 Crozz. The two variants feature slightly different styling and are produced by SAIC-Volkswagen and FAW-Volkswagen respectively.

For the SAIC-Volkswagen ID.4 X, the car gains  in length, mainly through the addition of a different bumper.

Sales

ID.4

See also
 Volkswagen ID.3
 Volkswagen ID. Buzz

References

External links 

 Official website (United States)
 Official website (United Kingdom)

ID.4
Cars introduced in 2020
Crossover sport utility vehicles
Production electric cars
Rear-wheel-drive vehicles
All-wheel-drive vehicles